Robert Joel Ferderer Sr. (June 3, 1934 – December 30, 2009) was an American politician and businessman.

Ferderer was born in Saint Paul, Minnesota and graduated from Johnson High School in Saint Paul. He lived in Saint Paul with his wife and family. He received his bachelor's degree in political science and his master's degree in counseling and psychology from University of St. Thomas. Ferderer also took courses in theology and spirituality from St. Catherine University. He also took graduate courses at University of Minnesota. Ferderer worked for 3M and was a marketing communications director. Ferderer served on several Minnesota Government Commissions involving crime prevention, law enforcement, national and community service, and medical practice. He served in the Minnesota House of Representatives in 1973 and 1974 and was a Republican. Ferderer died from complications due to Parkinson's disease at the Woodlyn Heights Health Care Center in Inver Grove Heights, Minnesota.

References

1934 births
2009 deaths
Businesspeople from Saint Paul, Minnesota
Politicians from Saint Paul, Minnesota
St. Catherine University alumni
University of St. Thomas (Minnesota) alumni
University of Minnesota alumni
3M people
Republican Party members of the Minnesota House of Representatives
Deaths from Parkinson's disease